Medea Miracle is a 2007 French-Italian drama film directed by Tonino De Bernardi and starring Isabelle Huppert.

Cast
 Julia Camps - Girl
 Eugenia Capizzano - Medea employed
 Lou Castel - Creo
 Rossella Dassu - Louise
 Giulietta De Bernardi - Martha
 Maria de Medeiros - Medea's friend
 Isabelle Huppert - Irène / Médée
 Teresa Momo - Girl
 Tommaso Ragno - Jason
 Isabelle Ruth - Homeless woman
 Marco Sgrosso - Absirtho

See also
 Isabelle Huppert on screen and stage

References

External links

2007 films
French drama films
Italian drama films
2000s French-language films
2007 drama films
Films based on Medea (Euripides play)
2000s French films
2000s Italian films